Tonekabon (also Romanized as Tonekābon; formerly known as Shahsavar (Persian: شَهسَوار), also Romanized as Shahsavār and Shahsawār) is a city and capital of Tonekabon County, Mazandaran Province, northern Iran.

At the 2006 census, its population was 43,128, in 13,087 families. The languages of Tonekabon are Mazandarani and Gilaki.

Etymology 
Toneka was a large and fortress-like city with a fence and a hard and strong surface in the west of Ruyan district. Shortly after the destruction of Toneka Castle, a lower city was built from the ruins of the old city, and it was called Toneka Bon. This name was extended to all the lands that formed the local rulers.

Geography

The town of Tonekabon is nearby along the Caspian Sea, and Tonekabon County has common borders with Qazvin Province to the south.

In its northern regions it has a moderate and humid climate and in the southern portions cold weather prevails. The
Cheshmeh Kileh River flows through it.

Climate
Tonekabon has a humid subtropical climate (Köppen: Cfa, Trewartha: Cf), with warm, humid summers and cool, damp winters.

History
The territory of Tonekabon was originally part of Gilan. Numerous evidences discovered in various parts of the region, indicate that it was a flourishing city in the past. The ancient Tonekabon came under the realm of the Royan territory, also called Rostamdar. The Padusbanan held the power of this vicinity till the reign of Shah Abbas Safavid I. Thereafter until the year 1209 CE. which was the beginning of the reign of Aqa Mohammad Khan Qajar and the Qajar dynasty, the city was known as Feiz.

After the downfall of the Qajar dynasty, the city was renamed Shahsavar. After the 1979 Revolution the name was returned to its original historic one, Tonekabon. Most present-day people of the city still use the Shahsavar name.

Economy
A famous variety of orange, Shahsavari Orange, is grown in the city and bears its former name. The other products of Tonekabon are kiwi fruit, rice, and tea.
Tonekabon has a semi tropical climate. The temperature is mild year round.

The "Ghalegardan high lands" and "Dohezar Valley" are famous resort areas in the Alborz (Elburz) mountain range, southwest of Tonekabon. There are also dense forests in Dohezar and the Sehezar Road areas of the Alborz.

Tourist Attractions

 Alam Kuh
 Sialan
 Cheshmeh Kileh Bridge
 Wildlife Museum
 Municipality Palace of Tonekabon
 Do Hezar Forest Park
 Se Hezar Forest Park
 Toneka Castle
 Markuh Castle
 Se Hezar Hot water
 Sang Bon Cheshmeh Waterfall
 Chaldarreh
 Daryasar Plain
 Dinar Sara
 Beles Kūh
 Kouhsar Waterfall
 Falakdeh Hot water
 Tonekabon Fish Market
 Garma Poshteh Village

Notable people

 Benyamin Bahadori (born 1944), singer
 Simin Ghanem (born 1982), singer
 Moslem Bahadori (born 1927), pathologist
 Shahab Hosseini (born 1974), actor
 Shamseddin Hosseini (born 1967), politician
 Foad Manshadi (born 1987), musician
 Jamshid Mashayekhi (born 1934), actor
 Javad Asghari Moghaddam (born 1979), futsal player
 Mohammad Mokhtari (born 1983), football player
 Ladan Mostofi (born 1972), actor
 Parisa (born 1950), singer
 Kourosh Sotoodeh (born 1978), photographer
 Mohammad Vali Khan Tonekaboni (1846–1926), politician
 Mohammad Zohari (1926–1995), poet

See also

References

External links
High quality photo gallery of Shahsavar (Tonekabon)
Gallery of Shahsavar (Tonekabon)
http://toniau.ac.ir/ Islamic Azad University of Tonekabon

Cities in Mazandaran Province

Populated coastal places in Iran
Populated places on the Caspian Sea